Wagtails Army is a 1964 Soviet family film directed by Aleksandrs Leimanis. Screen adaptation of the novel of the same name by Alexander Vlasov and Arkady Mlodik.

Plot 
Kolchak's train had an accident, at the site of which the White Guards discovered a checkbox with the text "Wagtails Army", as a result of which the massive arrests began.

Cast 
 Viktor Kholmogorov as Tryasoguzka
 Yuri Korzhov as Gypsy
 Aivars Galviņš as Mika
 Gunārs Cilinskis as Platais (voiced by Artyom Karapetyan)
 Ivan Kuznetsov as Kondrat
 Viktor Plyut as Nikolay
 Aleksey Alekseev as colonel
 Gurgen Tonunts as esaul
 Pavel Shpringfeld as lineman
 Uldis Dumpis as adjutant
 Ivan Lapikov as wounded man

Sequel
On December 23, 1968, the sequel to The Wagtail's Army Again in Battle was released on Soviet screens, also directed by Leimanis.

References

External links 
 

1964 films
1960s Russian-language films
Latvian-language films
Russian Civil War films
Soviet-era Latvian films
Russian children's adventure films
Latvian children's films
Soviet black-and-white films
Films based on Russian novels
Films set in the Soviet Union
Soviet children's films